Rait Rikberg (born 30 August 1982) is an Estonian volleyball player, who plays for his hometown club Bigbank Tartu.

Estonian national team
As a member of the senior Estonia men's national volleyball team, Rikberg competed at the 2015, 2017 and 2019 Men's European Volleyball Championship, finishing in 11th, 13th and 24th place respectively. He announced his retirement from the Estonia national team after the latter tournament.

Sporting achievements

National team
 2016  European League
 2018  European League
 2018  Challenger Cup

Individual
 2010 Baltic League – Best Libero
 2014 Baltic League – Best Libero
 2015 Baltic League – Best Libero
 2016 European League – Best Libero
 2017 Baltic League – Best Libero

Personal
His brother Alar is a volleyball coach.

References

1982 births
Sportspeople from Tartu
Living people
Estonian men's volleyball players
Estonian expatriate sportspeople in Belgium
Expatriate volleyball players in Belgium
Estonian expatriate volleyball players
21st-century Estonian people